Flint mining is the process of extracting flint from underground. Flint mines can be as simple as a pit on the surface or an area of quarrying, or it may refer to a series of shafts and tunnels used to extract flint.

Flint has been mined since the Palaeolithic, but was most common during the Neolithic. Flint was especially valued in prehistory for its use in weaponry. Although flint is not as valuable a resource in modern times, a few flint mines remain in operation even today (for example at Miorcani).

List of flint mines 

Austria

"Am Feuerstein" in Kleinwalsertal (Vorarlberg)
Belgium
The Neolithic flint mines of Spiennes
Jandrain-Jandrenouille (Orp-Jauche)
Denmark
Hov (near Thisted)
Egypt
Taramsa (near Qena)
Nazlet Khater (Upper Egypt)
France
 located between Caen and Falaise, Calvados
 
Le Grand-Pressigny
Germany
Lengfeld (near Bad Abbach).
 near Abensberg
Asch (near Blaubeuren)
Baiersdorf (near Essing)
Kleinkems in Efringen-Kirchen
Lousberg in Aachen
Bottmersdorf
Osterberg
On Rügen island there are the exposed flint fields between Mukran and Prora
Schernfeld
Great Britain
Beer (Devon)
Blackpatch, West Sussex
Grimes Graves near Brandon, close to the border between Norfolk and Suffolk
Cissbury
Church Hill, West Sussex
Harrow Hill, West Sussex
Penmaenmawr in Conwy County Borough, Wales
Hungary
Tata
Szentgál
Netherlands

Pakistan
Flint quarries in Rohri Hills and Ongar (Sindh province)
Poland
Krzemionki
Wierzbica "Zele"
Skałecznica Duża
Korycizna
Sąspów
Krunio
Borownia
Bębło
Rybniki
Romania
Outside the village of Miorcani, there is a modern flint mine
Piatra Tomii near the village of Răcătau
Spain
Casa Montero
Switzerland
between Olten and Wangen bei Olten
Lägern between Wettingen and Regensberg
Löwenburg (Pleigne, Canton of Jura)
USA
Alibates Flint Quarries National Monument

Further reading 

The above-mentioned flint mining sites and others are mentioned in the following texts:

Allard, Bostyn, Giligny, Lech (Editors) 2006
Aubry & Mangado 2006
Hunt Ortiz 1996
Matías Rodríguez, R. 2005
Weisgerber & Slotta 1999

See also 
Stone Fields in the Schmale Heath and Extension - nature reserve

References

External links 
http://www.flintsource.net/
http://www.minesdespiennes.org/
https://web.archive.org/web/20120415063337/http://bioge.ubbcluj.ro/~otis.crandell/cart/
http://www.britarch.ac.uk/ba/ba72/feat2.shtml
'Globalising archaeology: producing tools in the Neolithic on Google Arts& Culture

 
Prehistoric mines